Roslyn Littman "Roz" Schulte  (March 4, 1984 – May 20, 2009) was a United States Air Force officer killed in action in the U.S. war in Afghanistan, making her the first female United States Air Force Academy graduate to be killed by enemy action and the second female graduate killed in action. She was posthumously awarded the National Intelligence Medal for Valor and the Hawaii Medal of Honor.

Early life and education
Born on March 18, 1984, in St. Louis, Missouri, Schulte grew up in suburban Ladue, Missouri, and graduated from John Burroughs School in 2002. She was Jewish. Schulte served as an intern to former U.S. Sen. Wayne Allard of Colorado in 2005. She graduated from the U.S. Air Force Academy and was commissioned in 2006, part of the first class to have entered the academy after the September 11 attacks.

Military service
Schulte was assigned to the Pacific Air Force 613th Air and Space Operations Center at Hickam Air Force Base in Hawaii, and was sent on deployment as an intelligence, surveillance and reconnaissance operations officer. Three months after she arrived in Afghanistan, she was killed by a roadside bomb near Kabul.

In addition to the Bronze Star and Purple Heart, Roslyn was awarded the Air Force Commendation Medal, Joint Service Achievement Medal, Air Force Combat Action Medal, National Defense Service Medal, Afghanistan Campaign Medal and NATO Medal.

National Intelligence Medal for Valor citation
Schulte was posthumously awarded the National Intelligence Medal for Valor on January 25, 2010, the first named female recipient. Her citation noted "her courageous efforts to teach Afghan military officials how to gather and interpret military intelligence" and said, "She died in Afghanistan en route to a Bagram Airfield meeting on the very issue that powers the IC: sharing intelligence."

Legacy
Two buildings near Kabul were renamed in Schulte's honor: At Camp Eggers, one of the buildings was designated "Roz's House"; at Sia Sang, a building was named "Schulte's Place."

In 2010, the Air Force Academy created the Lt. Roslyn Schulte Cadet Award to recognize a cadet who "embodies the same impeccable character, unwavering leadership, and spirit of service that distinguished Lieutenant Schulte."

In 2011, Goodfellow Air Force Base dedicated a training facility building in Schulte's honor.

The conference room in the ISRD of the 613th Air and Space Operations Center at Joint Base Pearl Harbor-Hickam, Hawaii is named after 1Lt Schulte.

A conference room at 25th Air Force has also been dedicated in her honor.

See also
Women in warfare and the military (2000–present)
National Intelligence Medal for Valor Recipients
Notable War on Terror combatants
John Burroughs School alumni

References

1984 births
2009 deaths
Jewish American military personnel
American military personnel killed in the War in Afghanistan (2001–2021)
Military personnel from St. Louis
United States Air Force Academy alumni
United States Air Force officers
United States Air Force personnel of the War in Afghanistan (2001–2021)
20th-century American Jews
21st-century American Jews